The continent of Asia covers 29.4% of the Earth's land area and has a population of around 4.75 billion, accounting for about 60% of the world population. The combined population of both China and India are estimated to be over 2.8 billion people .
Asia's population is projected to grow to 5.25 billion by 2055, or about 54% of projected world population at that time. Population growth in Asia was close to 0.55% p.a. , with highly disparate rates. Many Western Asian and south asian countries have growth rates above world average, notably Pakistan at 2% p.a., while China had a small decrease of -0.06% and India had a 0.6% increase in 2022.

Population

History

Population of Asia, 1–1820 A.D. (million) 
Source: Maddison et al.

Shares of World Population, Asia, 1–1998 A.D. (per cent of world total) 
Source: Maddison et al.

Countries Ranking By International Organisations

Economy

Economically, most of Asia is traditionally considered part of the Second World, with the significant exception of the industrialized First World countries of Israel, Japan, Taiwan and South Korea. Asian countries in the G-20 major economies include China, Japan, South Korea, India, Indonesia, Turkey and Saudi Arabia. Of these, Japan is also in the G8, and additionally China and India in the G8+5.

The Human Development Index of Asian countries range from Low to Very High category. The table below shows the 10 highest and lowest countries according to their Human Development Index scores based on the 2021 report.

10 highest HDIs

10 lowest HDIs

Ethnicities

 Central Asian peoples: Turkic peoples, Iranian peoples
 East Asian peoples: List of Chinese ethnic groups (historical), Japanese people, Koreans, Mongols
 South Asian peoples: Ethnic groups of India, Ethnic groups in Pakistan, Dravidians, Indo-Aryans, Munda people
 Southeast Asian peoples: Austronesian peoples, Tai peoples; List of ethnic groups in Cambodia, ethnic groups in Indonesia, List of ethnic groups in Laos,  Ethnic groups of the Philippines, List of ethnic groups in Vietnam
 West Asian peoples: Arab people, Jews, Samaritans, Druze, Peoples of the Caucasus (transcontinental), Ethnic minorities in Iran, Ethnic minorities in Iraq; Iranian peoples, Turkmen, Turks

References

External links

World Population: Major Trends

 
Asia
Asia